Anders Haglund (born 4 November 1964) is a Swedish former professional golfer.

Haglund was born in Borås, Sweden and played college golf at the University of South Florida in the United States. As an amateur golfer, he won the inaugural European Amateur in 1986 at the Eindhoven Golf Club, which also won him the SR P4 Sjuhäradssporten Prize for sporting achievement of the year. 

Playing mainly on the Challenge Tour, Haglund won the Open de Bordeaux in 1989 and was tied for first in the rain-abandoned 1997 Interlaken Open. He won the Husqvarna Open on the Swedish Golf Tour in 1994 and was runner-up at the 1989 Wermland Open and 1987 Volvo Albatross on the same tour. He played on the European Tour in 1996 where his best finish was a 9th place at 15-under-par in the Hohe Brücke Open.

A shoulder injury ended Haglunds golfing career in 1997 and he became an NLP coach, advising clients including the Swedish National Golf Team, the first division football team Elfsborg and the Swedish Olympic Committee.

Amateur wins
1986 European Amateur, Spanish International Amateur Championship

Professional wins (2)

Challenge Tour wins (1)
1989 Volkswagen Open de Bordeaux

Swedish Golf Tour wins (1)

Team appearances
Amateur
European Amateur Team Championship (representing Sweden): 1987
Eisenhower Trophy (representing Sweden): 1988
St Andrews Trophy (representing the Continent of Europe): 1988

References

External links

Swedish male golfers
South Florida Bulls men's golfers
European Tour golfers
Sportspeople from Västra Götaland County
People from Borås
1964 births
Living people
20th-century Swedish people